She's Been Waiting is Kristy Hanson's second release. It was released in 2003.

Track listing
All tracks are composed by Kristy Hanson

"I Think" – 2:19
"Half the Moon" – 3:14
"She's Been Waiting" – 2:50
"Can't Go Back" – 2:40
"Alone on the Playground" – 2:19
"Take It Back" – 2:47

Personnel
Kristy Hanson - vocals, acoustic guitar, arranger
Mike Chiaburu - bass guitar (2,6), fretless bass (1,2,3), arranger
Todd Waters - drums (2,4,6)
Russell Sandon - drums (1,3), percussion (1,3)
Alisa Horn - cello (5)
Chris Konovaliv - mastering
Katie Overfield - viola (5)
Karl Shymanovitz - piano (6), executive producer
Carrie Thorson - flute (5)
Jocelyn Frank - oboe (5)

2003 albums